The western bronze-naped pigeon (Columba iriditorques) is a species of bird in the family Columbidae, part of the  subgenus Turturoena. A medium sized bird, it has a pale, broad terminal tail band which is noticeable on landing. It is found in most countries of Africa. The IUCN Red List classifies it as a species of least concern.

Taxonomy 
The species was first described in 1856 by the American ornithologist John Cassin. It is occasionally considered conspecific (belonging to the same species) with the eastern bronze-naped pigeon (Columba delegorguei) and the island bronze-naped pigeon (Columba malherbii), and the three species are sometimes placed in the subgenus Turturoena.

Description 
It has a pale, broad terminal tail band which is noticeable on landing.

Distribution and habitat 
It is widespread across the African tropical rainforest.

Status and conservation 
Since 1988, the western bronze-naped pigeon has been rated as a species of least concern on the IUCN Red List. This is because it has a large range, and because its population is stable and thought not to have declined by 30% over ten years or three generations. Although the population size has not been measured, it is thought to be more than the threshold required to warrant it a vulnerable rating. There is no evidence of any population decline of the species, or substantial threat to it.

References

External links

western bronze-naped pigeon
Birds of the African tropical rainforest
western bronze-naped pigeon
Taxonomy articles created by Polbot